Redore is a neighborhood located within the city of Hibbing in St. Louis County, Minnesota, USA. It was an independent unincorporated community until its annexation into Hibbing in 1979.

The community is located near the junction of Spudville Road and U.S. Hwy. 169 / Minn. Hwy. 73.

References

Unincorporated communities in Minnesota
Unincorporated communities in St. Louis County, Minnesota
Hibbing, Minnesota